Caieiras is a municipality in the state of São Paulo in Brazil. It is part of the Metropolitan Region of São Paulo. The population is 102,775 (2020 est.) in an area of 97.64 km². Due to the municipality's large reforestation area, it is known as the "City of the Pines".

The municipality contains part of the  Cantareira State Park, created in 1962, which protects a large part of the metropolitan São Paulo water supply.

The municipality is served by  CPTM Line 7 (Ruby).

Economy
The economy of the city is based on paper industry. Most of the territory of the town consists of reforesting areas  belonging to Companhia Melhoramentos de São Paulo.

References

External links

EncontraCaieiras - Find everything about Caieiras

Municipalities in São Paulo (state)